Good Morning and... Goodbye! is a 1967 American exploitation film directed by Russ Meyer. It features Alaina Capri, Karen Ciral, as well as Meyer regular Jack Moran, who co-wrote the script.

Plot
In a country town, farmer Burt is married to the much younger Angel but cannot satisfy her sexually. Angel has an affair with a construction worker, Stone. Lana is Burt's 17 year old daughter to another woman. She tries to seduce Ray but he is more interested in Angel, so Lana winds up with Stone. Burt meets a sorceress in the forest who rejuvenates his sexual drive, leading him to be reunited with Angel. Lana winds up with Ray. Stone is beaten up by the husband of one of his earlier conquests.

Cast
Alaina Capri as Angel
Stuart Lancaster as Burt
Pat Wright as Stone
Haji as The Catalyst
Karen Ciral as Lana
Don Johnson as Ray
Tom Howland as Herb
Megan Timothy as Lottie
Toby Adler as Betty
Sylvia Tedemar as Go-go dancer
Cara Peters as Nude opening runner

Production
The cast included regular Meyer actress, Haji, who recalled:
I did all my own costuming. I got up hours ahead of time to put those costumes together. I would just go out with a big bag and collect rose petals! I was late one morning for breakfast, and Russ -- he would sit at the head of the table -- he said, "Where were you?!" I shook the bag and said, "I was in the woods cutting down my costume!" I'd tape rose petals in my hair, on my breasts, and between my legs, and that would be my costume. I glued dead bugs on my cheeks and put green sticks and moss in my hair.

Reception
The New York Times reviewed a Meyer film for the first time. It said Meyer "makes his points to the point of redunancy."

Roger Ebert later wrote that the film, along with Common Law Cabin, was "not among Meyer's best later work. The plots are too diffuse to maintain dramatic tension, the acting is indifferent, and there is an uncharacteristic amount of aimless dialogue. In retrospect, however, these films can be seen as Meyer's gradual disengagement from plot."

The film was banned in Chicago but this ban was overruled.

See also
List of American films of 1967

References

External links
 
Good Morning and Goodbye at TCMDB
 
Good Morning and Goodbye at Letter Box

Films directed by Russ Meyer
1967 films
1967 crime drama films
1960s English-language films
Films with screenplays by Russ Meyer
1960s exploitation films
American crime drama films
1960s American films